The splendid lanternshark (Etmopterus splendidus) is a shark of the family Etmopteridae found in the western Pacific at depths between 120 and 210 m.  Its length is up to 30 cm.

Reproduction is ovoviviparous.

References

 
 Compagno, Dando, & Fowler, Sharks of the World, Princeton University Press, New Jersey 2005 

Etmopterus
Fish described in 1988